Kostonjärvi  is a medium-sized lake in the Iijoki main catchment area. It is located in Taivalkoski municipality, in the Northern Ostrobothnia region in Finland. The surface elevation on the lake varies almost 5 meter due to the power production.

See also
List of lakes in Finland

References

Lakes of Posio
Lakes of Taivalkoski